The Institut Nacional d'Educació Física de Catalunya (INEFC) is an indoor venue located in Barcelona. Renovated in 1991 on a design by Ricardo Bofill Taller de Arquitectura, it hosted the wrestling events for the 1992 Summer Olympics.

See also
 Anella Olímpica
 List of works by Ricardo Bofill Taller de Arquitectura

References
1992 Summer Olympics official report. Volume 2. pp. 177–80.
Official website

External links 
 

Venues of the 1992 Summer Olympics
Ricardo Bofill buildings
Olympic wrestling venues
Sports venues in Barcelona
Olympic International Broadcast Centres
1991 establishments in Spain